Jordan Misja High School is a public high school located in the major northern city of Shkodra, Albania. Established in 1957, it is named after People's Hero of Albania, Jordan Misja.

External links 
 Jordan Misja High School website

See also 
 28 Nentori High School

Secondary schools in Albania
1957 establishments in Albania
Buildings and structures in Shkodër
Educational institutions established in 1957